Konstantin Kostenko (10 November 1939 – 6 February 2004) was a Soviet sprint canoer who competed in the late 1960s and  in the early 1970s. He won three medals in the K-2 10000 m event at the ICF Canoe Sprint World Championships with two golds (1970, 1971) and a bronze (1974).

References

Konstantin Kostenko at Infosport.ru  

1939 births
2004 deaths
People from Magadan
Soviet male canoeists
ICF Canoe Sprint World Championships medalists in kayak